Heinrich Sterr (24 September 1919 – 26 November 1944) was a World War II Luftwaffe military aviator. As a flying ace, he is credited with 130 aerial victories predominantly claimed on the Eastern Front. He was a recipient of the Knight's Cross of the Iron Cross, the highest award in the military and paramilitary forces of Nazi Germany during World War II. On 26 November 1944, he was shot down and killed in action by USAAF fighters.

Career
Sterr was born on 24 September 1919 in Ortenburg, Lower Bavaria as part of the Free State of Bavaria. Unlike many other flying aces in the Luftwaffe, he was not a member of the pre-war Luftwaffe (he had only just turned 20 when war broke out) and he missed the early warfare over Poland, France and the first year in the East. After completing his pilot-training in 1942, Sterr was sent as an Unteroffizier, to 6. Staffel (6th squadron) of Jagdgeschwader 54 (JG 54—54th Fighter Wing). At the time it was based at Ryelbitzi, west of Lake Ilmen covering the battles around Demyansk Pocket as the Soviets continued to try and break through the German forces in front of Leningrad where he scored his first victory on 6 April when he shot down a Mikoyan-Gurevich MiG-3 fighter aircraft.

In late 1942, II. Gruppe was scheduled to be reequipped with the Focke Wulf Fw 190 A-4 at Heiligenbeil, present-day Mamonovo. On 7 January 1943, Sterr was shot down and wounded in his Messerschmitt Bf 109 G-2 (Werknummer 13609—factory number) by Lavochkin-Gorbunov-Gudkov LaGG-3 fighters in the vicinity of Ramushevo on the Lovat River. By the end of March 1943, Sterr had over 30 victories, and on 30 April he was awarded the Honour Goblet of the Luftwaffe. In June, Luftflotte 1 staged a last big effort to blow the railway bridges of the vital supply link to Leningrad. In July, most other fighter Gruppen were assembled around the Kursk salient for the next German offensive - Operation Zitadelle. Although II./JG 54 was kept back guarding Leningrad, it appears several of its pilots, including Oberfeldwebel Sterr, went with I./JG 54 to Orel. In the fortnight or so that it was where he scored a further ten victories to add to his tally of shootdowns. On 23 July, he was awarded the German Cross in Gold.

Eventually the German forces were stretched too thin across the Eastern Front to provide constant air cover and were increasingly being used as "fire brigades", as new Soviet offensives broke out up and down the line. Sterr's victory list is a case in point, on the nomadic existence of II./JG 54 from here on: early August gave 15 victories over Leningrad, then later in the month a clutch of victories south-east of Smolensk. On 8 October 1943, Sterr became an "ace-in-a-day" for the second time, claiming six Lavochkin La-5 fighters shot down north of Kiev. He managed to bail out but was wounded nevertheless.

Oberfeldwebel Sterr was awarded the Knight's Cross of the Iron Cross on 5 December 1943 (nominally for 86 victories) and sent home for officer-training. Returning as a Leutnant in January he was back to Ukraine where he shot down more Soviet aircraft. On 29 March 1944, Sterr was credited with his 100th aerial victory, making him the 68th Luftwaffe pilot to achieve the century mark. In March, he was then briefly posted to 3./JG 54 in Estonia for a couple of months. When he returned to 6./JG 54 at the start of May, II./JG 54 was back on the central sector.

When the next Soviet offensive, Operation Bagration, started at the end of June, its devastating force shattered most of Army Group Centre and forced rapid retreats. Despite inflicting nearly 500 losses on the Soviets, JG 54 was powerless to halt the advance. In August, the Jagdwaffe (Luftwaffe fighter force) had a major unit re-organization. From this 6./JG 54 was renamed 16./JG 54, and transferred to operate as part of IV./JG 54 which was re-equipping near Warsaw at the time. Having recently lost their Staffelkapitän (Squadron leader), Oberleutnant Sterr was appointed the unit's Staffelführer (Flight leader) also in August. His last shootdown on the Eastern front was a Yak-9 fighter, which he shot down on 12 August.

Defense of the Reich
On 17 September 1944, the Allied Forces launched Operation Market Garden to seize the bridges to Arnhem. This forced the urgent transfer of the ill-prepared IV. Gruppe of JG 54 to the west because Luftwaffe aviation regiments were still rebuilding after many were hammered during the Normandy invasion. This was now a different air war - not the low-level dogfighting and pursuits of the Eastern Front, but the high-altitude engagement against the massive American bomber formations, and their hundreds of escort fighters. With such odds stacked against them, it was often just luck if a pilot would survive. In just 3 weeks, IV. Gruppe of JG 54 lost 30 pilots for only 10 victories - and was soon pulled out the line to reform for the second time in a month.

In early November, Sterr was formally appointed as the Staffelkapitän of 16. Staffel of JG 54, the unit he had served with for nearly his entire combat career. Flying Fw 190 A-8 (Werknummer 171684), Sterr was killed in action on 26 November 1944 while during his landing approach at an airfield at Vörden. He was shot down by a Republic P-47 Thunderbolt piloted by Captain P.L. Larsen from the 78th Fighter Group. He was nominated for the Knight's Cross of the Iron Cross with Oak Leaves. He was succeeded by Leutnant Paul Brandt as commander of 16. Staffel of JG 54.

Summary of career

Aerial victory claims
According to US historian David T. Zabecki, Sterr was credited with 129 aerial victories. Spick lists Sterr with 130 aerial victories in an unknown number of combat missions, all but three on the Eastern Front. Mathews and Foreman, authors of Luftwaffe Aces — Biographies and Victory Claims, researched the German Federal Archives and found records for 108 aerial victories, all but two claimed on the Eastern Front.

Victory claims were logged to a map-reference (PQ = Planquadrat), for example "PQ 28142". These sectors were then subdivided into 36 smaller units to give a location area 3 × 4 km in size.

Awards
 Wound Badge in Black
 Iron Cross (1939) 2nd and 1st Class
 Honour Goblet of the Luftwaffe on 30 April 1943 as Feldwebel and pilot
 German Cross in Gold on 23 July 1943 as Oberfeldwebel in the 6./Jagdgeschwader 54
 Knight's Cross of the Iron Cross on 5 December 1943 as Oberfeldwebel and pilot in the 6./Jagdgeschwader 54

Notes

References

Citations

Bibliography

 
 
 
 
 
 
 
 
 
 
 
 
 
 
 
 

 

1919 births
1944 deaths
People from Passau (district)
Luftwaffe pilots
German World War II flying aces
Luftwaffe personnel killed in World War II
Recipients of the Gold German Cross
Recipients of the Knight's Cross of the Iron Cross
Military personnel from Bavaria
Aviators killed by being shot down